Funny Boy may refer to: 

Funny Boy (novel), a 1994 novel by Shyam Selvadurai
Funny Boy (film), a 2020 Canadian drama film adaptation of the Selvadurai novel directed by Deepa Mehta
Funny Boy (1987 film), a French film directed by Christian Le Hémonet